Gable Mountain is located in the Lewis Range, Glacier National Park in the U.S. state of Montana.

See also
 List of mountains and mountain ranges of Glacier National Park (U.S.)

References

Mountains of Glacier County, Montana
Mountains of Glacier National Park (U.S.)
Lewis Range
Mountains of Montana